Acracantha is a genus of true crane fly.

Distribution
Australia.

Species
A. inornata Skuse, 1890
A. monticola Skuse, 1890
A. sydneyensis Skuse, 1890

References

Tipulidae
Tipuloidea genera
Diptera of Australasia